Leigh McMillan was a Canadian football player who played for the Edmonton Eskimos. He won the Grey Cup with the Eskimos in 1955 and 1956. He played junior football for the Edmonton Wildcats. He is a member of the Edmonton Sports Hall of Fame.

McMillan was a gym teacher at Austin O'Brien High School in Edmonton.

References

1930s births
Possibly living people
Edmonton Elks players
Canadian football people from Edmonton
Players of Canadian football from Alberta